Zsuzsa Czinkóczi (born January 23, 1967) is a Hungarian actress. Her best-known work includes Árvácska (1976), Just Like Home (1978), Diary for My Children (1984), Diary for My Lovers (1987) and Napló apámnak, anyámnak (1990).

References

External links

 

Living people
Hungarian film actresses
Hungarian television actresses
1967 births
Hungarian child actresses
Place of birth missing (living people)